Thyroid receptor-interacting protein 11 is a protein that in humans is encoded by the TRIP11 gene.

Function 

TRIP11 was first identified through its ability to interact functionally with thyroid hormone receptor-beta (THRB; MIM 190160). It has also been found in association with the Golgi apparatus and microtubules.[supplied by OMIM]

Interactions 

TRIP11 has been shown to interact with Retinoblastoma protein and Thyroid hormone receptor alpha.

References

Further reading